Mahendravarman I (600–630 CE) was a Pallava emperor who ruled the Southern portion of present-day Andhra region and Northern regions of what forms present-day Tamil Nadu in India in the early 7th century. He was a scholar, painter, architect, musician. He was the son of Simhavishnu, who defeated the Kalabhras and re-established the Pallava kingdom.

During his reign, the Chalukya king Pulakeshin II attacked the Pallava kingdom. The Pallavas fought a series of wars in the northern Vengi region, before Mahendravarma decimated his chief enemies at Pullalur (according to Pallava grants at Kuram, Kasakudi and Tadantottam). Although Mahendravarma saved his capital, he lost the northern provinces to Pulakeshin. Tamil literature flourished under his rule, with the rise in popularity of Tevaram written by Appar and Sambandhar. Mahendravarman I was the author of the play Mattavilasa Prahasana which is a Sanskrit satire. During his period "Bhagwatajjukam", another satire (prahasan), was written by Bodhayan. King Mahendravarman mentioned this on a stone inscription in Mamandur along with his own Mattavilas Prahasan.

Mahendravarma was succeeded to the throne by his more famous son Narasimhavarman I in 630 CE.
who defeated  Pulakeshin II of Chalukya dynasty and ransacked the Chalukyan capital city of Vatapi (also known as Badami).

Patronage of arts and architecture

Construction of these started in the reign of Mahendravarma I Mahendravarman was a great patron of letters and architecture. He constructed the Mahabalipuram Lighthouse and Kanchi University where Vedas, Buddhism, Jainism, Painting, Music & Dance were taught. He was the pioneer of the Rock-cut Architecture amongst the Pallavas.  The inscription at the rock-cut Mandagapattu Tirumurti Temple hails him as Vichitrachitta and claims that the temple was built without wood, brick, mortar or metal. The five-celled cave temple at Pallavaram was also built during his reign as was the Kokarneswarar Temple, Thirukokarnam of Pudukottai, Tamil Nadu. He made Kudimiya malai Inscription. His paintings are found in Sittanavasal Cave (Tamil Nadu).

Fine examples of his rock-cut temples can be witnessed at Mahabalipuram, (Satyagirinathar and Satyagirishwarar twin temples), Siyamangalam (the Siva temple Avanibhajana Pallaveswaram) in North Arcot district and the upper rock-cut temple at Trichy. Apart from the Siva temples, Mahendravarma also excavated a few Vishnu cave temples, the Mahendravishnugrha at Mahendravadi, and the Ranganatha Temple at Singavaram in present-day Gingee (then North Arcot district).

He was also the author of the play Mattavilasa Prahasana, a farce concerning Buddhist and Saiva ascetics. He is also claimed to be the author of another play called Bhagavadajjuka,. This is evident by the inscriptions found at Mamandur cave shrines (near Kanchipuram - this place is mentioned as Dusi Mamandur to avoid confusions with other places by the same name). However, there is an alternate view that attributes this play to Bodhayana.

Religion

Mahendrravarma was initially a patron of the Jainism, but he converted into the Saiva faith under the influence of the Saiva saint Appar. According to Dhivyacharitam a Sanskrit work on life of Alwars written in 12th century, Yatotkara perumal (mahavishnu), enshrined in Kancheepuram left the city along with his great devotee Thirumalisai Alvar, because the Vaishnava Alwar faced tough persecution and exilement from the king who had at least temporarily come under the influence of Jainism.

In literature and popular culture

Mahendravarman I is a prominent characters in Tamil historical fiction novel Sivagamiyin Sapatham by Kalki Krishnamurthy, that talks about the first Vatapi invasion into the Pallava Kingdom, Mahendravarman's heroic deeds in the war and securing the Kanchi fort from the imminent invasion of the huge Vatapi army, his loss to the Vatapi Pulikesi and eventual death. The inscriptions in Madangapattu mentions him as a curious king who wanted to discard perishable material like wood, brick, metal or mortar for building temples. He was a pioneer in rock-cut inscription. Literature also mentions that he built the famous Mahendratankta, the famous irrigation tank. He initiated most of the monuments in Mahabalipuram, which in modern times are grouped as Group of Monuments at Mahabalipuram and one of the UNESCO world heritage sites.

Notes

References

External links

7th-century Indian monarchs
Pallava kings
Ancient Indian dramatists and playwrights
7th-century Indian writers
Indian male writers
Indian male dramatists and playwrights
Dramatists and playwrights from Tamil Nadu